Jaroslav Šedivý (12 November 1929 – 28 January 2023) was a Czech politician who served as the second Minister of Foreign Affairs of the Czech Republic, from 8 November 1997 until 17 July 1998. A historian, Šedivý was active in dissident movement against the communist regime. His son Jiří Šedivý served as Minister of Defense in 2006–2007.

References

External links
 Memory of nations: Jaroslav Šedivý

1929 births
2023 deaths
Charles University alumni
Politicians from Prague
Recipients of Medal of Merit (Czech Republic)
Recipients of the Legion of Honour
Czech diplomats
Diplomats from Prague
Ambassadors of the Czech Republic to France
Ambassadors of the Czech Republic to Belgium
Ambassadors of the Czech Republic to Switzerland
Civic Democratic Party (Czech Republic) Government ministers
Foreign Ministers of the Czech Republic